Stefan Huber (born 14 June 1966) is a Swiss former footballer who played as a goalkeeper during the 1980s, 1990s and early 2000s.

Club career
Huber played his youth football by local club FC Unterstrass. He then moved to Grasshopper Club and began his professional career under with them in 1984 under head-coach Miroslav Blažević. Four years later he then moved to Lausanne Sports under manager Radu Nunweiller. He played there for five years, to start with as first choice keeper, but then in the season 1992–93 Fabrice Borer transferred in and took over.

Therefore, Huber moved on and joined FC Basel's first team for their 1993–94 season under head-coach Claude Andrey. After playing in four test games Huber played his domestic league debut for the club in the home game in the St. Jakob Stadium on 28 July 1993 Basel as were defeated 1–2 by local rivals Old Boys. During that season his teammates were the likes of the defenders Massimo Ceccaroni, Marco Walker and Samir Tabakovic, the midfielders Mario Cantaluppi, Martin Jeitziner, Admir Smajić and Ørjan Berg and the Swiss international strikers Dario Zuffi and Philippe Hertig. Together they won the promotion/relegation group and became Nationalliga B champions and thus won promotion to the top flight of Swiss football. This after six seasons in the second tier.

He stayed with the club for six years and during this time Huber played a total of 263 games for Basel. 185 of these games were in the Nationalliga and Nationalliga A, 16 in the Swiss Cup, seven in the UEFA Intertoto Cup and 55 were friendly games.

Huber returned to Grasshopper Club in 1999 as the two clubs made a goalkeeper swap with Pascal Zuberbühler. Huber retired from active football in 2002. After retiring from playing, he became Grasshopper's goalkeeping coach from 2005 until 2007.

International career
Stefan Huber also played 16 times for the Switzerland national football team between 1991 and 1999.

References

Sources
 Rotblau: Jahrbuch Saison 2017/2018. Publisher: FC Basel Marketing AG. 
 Die ersten 125 Jahre. Publisher: Josef Zindel im Friedrich Reinhardt Verlag, Basel. 
 Verein "Basler Fussballarchiv" Homepage

External links
 

1966 births
Living people
Swiss men's footballers
Switzerland international footballers
Swiss Super League players
Swiss Challenge League players
Grasshopper Club Zürich players
FC Lausanne-Sport players
FC Basel players
Association football goalkeepers